Glaucocharis lathonia is a moth in the family Crambidae. It was described by Stanisław Błeszyński in 1966. It is found on the Moluccas and Solomon Islands.

References

Diptychophorini
Moths described in 1966